Lebyazhye is a rural locality (a selo) in Obrastsovo-Travinsky Selsoviet, Kamyzyaksky District, Astrakhan Oblast, Russia. The population was 732 as of 2010. There are 4 streets.

Geography 
Lebyazhye is located 36 km south of Kamyzyak (the district's administrative centre) by road. Nikolayevsky is the nearest rural locality.

References 

Rural localities in Kamyzyaksky District